Dudley "Dud" Shaw Richards (February 4, 1932 – February 15, 1961) was an American figure skater who competed in men's singles and pairs.  In singles, he won the bronze medal at the 1953 United States Figure Skating Championships and finished sixth at that year's World Figure Skating Championships. In pairs, he once skated with future Olympic gold medalist Tenley Albright, before later teaming up with Maribel Owen. After winning the bronze medal at Nationals in 1958 and 1959, the pair captured the silver in 1960 and finished tenth at that year's Winter Olympic Games. In 1961, Owen and Richards won the gold medal at the U.S. Championships and finished second at the North American Figure Skating Championships.

Away from the ice, Richards was a graduate of Harvard University and had spent time in the Army. He was also a real estate executive and a longtime friend (and college roommate) of future Senator Ted Kennedy.

Richards was en route to the World Championships in 1961 when the plane he was on, Sabena Flight 548, crashed near Brussels, Belgium, killing all on board including the entire U.S. figure skating team. He was 29 at the time of his death.

Results
(men's singles)

(pairs with Maribel Owen)

External links

 U.S. Figure Skating biography
 Remembering Flight 548: Shattered dreams
 

American male pair skaters
American male single skaters
Figure skaters at the 1960 Winter Olympics
1961 deaths
Olympic figure skaters of the United States
Victims of aviation accidents or incidents in Belgium
Harvard University alumni
1932 births
Victims of aviation accidents or incidents in 1961
Sportspeople from Providence, Rhode Island
20th-century American people